Nueva Ecija's 4th congressional district is one of the four congressional districts of the Philippines in the province of Nueva Ecija. It has been represented in the House of Representatives since 1987. The district consists of the city of Gapan and adjacent municipalities in southern Nueva Ecija, namely Cabiao, General Tinio, Jaen, Peñaranda, San Antonio, San Isidro and San Leonardo. It is currently represented in the 18th Congress by Emerson D. Pascual of the PDP-Laban.

Representation history

Election results

2022

2019

2016

2013

2010

See also
Legislative districts of Nueva Ecija

References

Congressional districts of the Philippines
Politics of Nueva Ecija
1987 establishments in the Philippines
Congressional districts of Central Luzon
Constituencies established in 1987